The Crooked Mile is an avant-garde musical set in Soho, London with music by Peter Greenwell to book and lyrics by Peter Wildeblood. The play premiered at the Cambridge Theatre, London, in 1959, directed by Kenneth Alwyn and starring Millicent Martin and Elisabeth Welch. The music was orchestrated by Gordon Langford.

The show ran for 164 performances, closing prematurely on 30 January 1960, despite continuing mainly positive reviews.

The music
The cast recording was made in August 1959 and released on Top Rank UK JKP 2035 1959	EP
Crooked Mile 
Someone Else's Baby 
If I Ever Fall In Love Again 
Lollybye 
Down To Earth	 
Meet The Family	 
Luigi

 Sarah Brightman revived "If I Ever Fall in Love Again" on The Songs That Got Away.

References

1959 musicals
British musicals
West End musicals